Cane Creek is a stream in Cape Girardeau County, Missouri. It is a tributary of Byrd Creek.

The stream headwaters arise at  along the west side of Fruitland.

Cane Creek was lined with cane, hence the name.

See also
List of rivers of Missouri

References

Rivers of Cape Girardeau County, Missouri
Rivers of Missouri